Conostigmus is a genus of parasiotoid wasps belonging to the superfamily Ceraphronoidea. It is the second-largest genus within the family Megaspilidae (Johnson & Musetti 2004). The genus has a worldwide distribution with over 170 extant species.

Though it is the second largest genus within Megaspilidae, little is known about its life history. A few species are known to be ectoparasitoids, though it is likely that the genus also contains endoparasitoids as well, since the sister genus Dendrocerus contains both life strategies. It is likely that Conostigmus contains hyperparasitoids as well.

References 

Dessart, P. & Cancemi, P. 1987. Tableau dichotomique des genres de Ceraphronoidea (Hymenoptera) avec commentaires et nouvelles especies. Frustula Entomologica 7-8: 307-372.
Johnson, N. F. & L. Musetti. 2004. Catalog of the systematic literature of the superfamily Ceraphronoidea (Hymenoptera). Contributions of the American Entomological Institute 33 (2): 1-149.

Ceraphronoidea
Taxa named by Anders Gustaf Dahlbom